The 1971 Rothmans International Quebec – Doubles was an event of the 1971 Rothmans International Quebec men's tennis tournament held at the Laval University sports centre in Quebec City, Quebec in Canada from 26 July through 1 August 1971. The draw comprised 15 teams. Roy Emerson and Rod Laver won the doubles title, defeating Tom Okker and Marty Riessen in the final, 7–6, 6–2.

Draw

References

External links
 ITF tournament edition details

Quebec WCT Tournament
Tennis in Canada
1971 in Canadian tennis